The 2019 AAF season was the only season in the history of the Alliance of American Football (AAF), which began on February 9, 2019. A ten-week regular season was scheduled for each of the league's eight teams.

On April 2, multiple sources indicated that Thomas Dundon, controlling owner of the AAF, had followed through on threats made in the previous week and suspended the AAF's operations, against the will of its founders. By the end of the week, the AAF front office had confirmed the suspension of operations and allowed players to opt-out of their contracts to sign with other leagues. The league filed for Chapter 7 bankruptcy on April 17, 2019.

At the time the season ended, eight out of ten scheduled weeks had been played, and the Orlando Apollos, with a league best 7–1 record two games ahead of its nearest competitors, had clinched no less than a share of the regular season's best record, regardless of how the rest of the schedule would have played out. A four-team playoff was scheduled to start on April 21, with a championship game on April 27. Initially scheduled for Sam Boyd Stadium on the outskirts of Las Vegas, Nevada, the title game was moved to the Ford Center at The Star in Frisco, Texas, before the league ceased operations.

Teams

The Alliance of American Football had eight teams competing during its inaugural season.

Final standings
The Orlando Apollos clinched a playoff berth on March 24, and top seed in the Eastern Conference on March 30. The Birmingham Iron clinched a playoff berth on March 31.

Schedule
Each team had a ten-game regular season schedule, consisting of six in-conference games (home-and-away against each of the other three teams) and four out-of-conference games (one game against each of four teams; two home and two away). Weeks 2, 4, 6, and 9 were scheduled with out-of-conference games. Each team played one preseason exhibition game against an out-of-conference opponent. All of the preseason scrimmage games were held January 27–28 at the Alamodome, in conjunction with the league's training camp.

Playoffs
Following the 10-week regular season, the top two teams in each conference were due to face each other in conference championship games, hosted by the higher seeded team. These semifinals were scheduled for April 21. The winners would then meet in the league championship game on April 27 at a neutral site. Originally, the title game had been set for Sam Boyd Stadium near Las Vegas, Nevada announced October 23, 2018 , but was changed to Ford Center at The Star in Frisco, Texas on March 20, 2019, before the season was ended.

Attendance
Announced attendance figures for each home game. In the weekly columns, dashes (—) indicate away games, while bold font indicates the highest attendance of each team. Games marked "N/A" were not played.

Source:

Awards

Players of the week

Statistical leaders
Records reflect statistics through the eight regular season games played by all teams.

Officials
The league used the eight-official system (with the center judge), also seen in NCAA college football. There were six officiating crews, staffed with officials from FBS conferences.

The officiating crews included one former NFL official—Jimmy DeBell, a back judge on the Smith crew—and three former NFL players: Nate Jones (side judge, Cruse crew), Terry Killens (umpire, Blake crew), and Mike Morton (umpire, Cruse crew).

Broadcasting
CBS Sports, Turner Sports and NFL Network served as the Alliance's broadcast partners for the 2019 season. The CBS Sports deal was announced at the time the league launched, while the Turner Sports and NFL Network contracts were announced less than two weeks before the season began. 
 CBS Sports carried the two inaugural games (February 9) regionally via the CBS broadcast network, and was due to carry the championship game broadcast nationwide on the same network. CBS later added one conference championship game and one Week 9 regular season game to their schedule, neither of which was played. CBS Sports Network carried a game of the week on Sunday afternoons.
 The Turner Sports contract included one regular season game (February 16) and a conference championship game on TNT, and a Saturday afternoon game of the week on Bleacher Report's live streaming service, B/R Live. The network had the option to change which service it broadcast its games on, with TNT adding three midseason Saturday afternoon games from B/R Live. Had the league survived the full season, B/R Live would have carried a Sunday afternoon game for Week 9, swapping a game with CBS. In Week 10, B/R Live was due to carry the league's one game of the season scheduled for a Friday.
 NFL Network carried the remainder of the league's games, a Saturday night game and a Sunday night game each week.

Viewership
In millions of viewers

One decimal place is shown in table but three decimal places are used in all calculations. None of CBS Sports Network's broadcasts register in the Nielsen Ratings and thus viewership estimates for those games are not available.

Local radio coverage
Each AAF team had a local radio partner, and Sirius XM Radio carried a game of the week package.

Signees to other professional leagues

NFL
On April 4, the AAF announced players could leave their contracts to sign with NFL teams following the reported suspension of league football operations. The following 99 players signed with NFL teams:

Nine players who were under contract with AAF teams at the time the league ceased operations made initial NFL 53-man active rosters on August 31, 2019: offensive tackle Brandon Greene with the Carolina Panthers, quarterback Garrett Gilbert and running back D'Ernest Johnson with the Cleveland Browns, cornerback De'Vante Bausby and defensive tackle Mike Purcell with the Denver Broncos, long snapper Cole Mazza with the Los Angeles Chargers, kicker Taylor Bertolet with the New York Jets, cornerback Kameron Kelly with the Pittsburgh Steelers, and offensive tackle Daniel Brunskill with the San Francisco 49ers.

CFL
The following players signed with Canadian Football League (CFL) teams:

The AAF reportedly blocked AAF players from signing with CFL teams, claiming their AAF contracts were "assets in potential bankruptcy proceedings." Plummer, Gilchrist, and Braverman had signed contracts with AAF teams, but had not yet been activated to the roster from their respective teams' rights lists at the time that the AAF suspended football operations. By April 18, CFL players were allowed to sign AAF players.

AFL
The following players signed with Arena Football League (AFL) teams:

Wide receiver Malachi Jones received first-team All-Arena, Receiver of the Year, and Offensive Player of the Year honors at the conclusion of the 2019 AFL season, which was also the AFL's final season before shutting down afterwards. Wide receiver Fabian Guerra was named co-Rookie of the Year as well.

NAL
The following three players signed with National Arena League (NAL) teams:

References

Further reading

External links
 
 Statistical leaders at NoExtraPoints.com

Alliance of American Football
season